Nicolas Jean-Christophe Escudé (born 3 April 1976) is a former professional tennis player from France, who turned professional in 1995. He won four singles titles and two doubles titles during his career.

Escudé is best remembered for the vital role he played in the 2001 Davis Cup final against Australia on the grass-courts of Melbourne. Escudé beat the recently crowned World No. 1, Lleyton Hewitt in the first rubber with a win in five sets, repeating what he did to Hewitt earlier that year in the fourth round of Wimbledon. Two days later, Escudé won the decisive fifth rubber for France against Wayne Arthurs in four sets.

The right-hander reached his highest individual ranking on the ATP Tour on 26 June 2000, when he became World No. 17. He's a natural left-hander who was trained since a child to play right-handed but does everything else lefty. His brother Julien Escudé is a professional football player.

Escudé teamed up with Roger Federer in the men's doubles at the French Open in 2000. However they were knocked out by Sébastien Lareau and Daniel Nestor.

In 2006, he announced his immediate retirement from the sport due to a persistent shoulder injury that had been keeping him out of the professional tennis circuit for the past 22 months.

Escudé was the captain of the France Fed Cup team from 2009 to 2012 and is now the co-coach of Nicolas Mahut since the 2013 season with Thierry Ascione and since 2014 of Jo-Wilfried Tsonga.

Career finals

Singles (4 wins, 2 losses)

Doubles (2 wins)

Singles performance timeline

Top 10 wins

External links
 
 
 
 Bio – file with Nicolas Escude

1976 births
Living people
French expatriate sportspeople in Switzerland
French male tennis players
French tennis coaches
Olympic tennis players of France
Sportspeople from Chartres
Tennis players from Geneva
Tennis players at the 2000 Summer Olympics